Fever (1999) is a psychological thriller written and directed by Alex Winter and starring Henry Thomas, David O'Hara, Teri Hatcher and Bill Duke.

Plot
Nick Parker (Henry Thomas) is a struggling young artist suffering a mental and physical breakdown. When a violent murder happens in his apartment building, it pushes him to the edge of sanity. Suspected by his sister (Teri Hatcher) and tracked by a police detective (Bill Duke), Nick begins to think he may have committed the murder himself except for the appearance of a mysterious drifter (David O'Hara) who has moved in upstairs. Is he a witness or a murderer, and was it all a setup or illusion? The bottom line is: Who can you trust when you can no longer trust yourself?

Cast
Henry Thomas as Nick Parker
David O'Hara as Will 
Teri Hatcher as Charlotte Parker
Bill Duke as Detective Glass
Sándor Técsy as Sidney Miskiewicz
Irma St. Paule as Mrs. Rhula Miskiewicz
Alex Kilgore as Adam Dennis
Marisol Padilla Sánchez as Soledad
Patricia Dunnock as Sophie Parker
Helen Hanft as Louisa

Reviews
 A.O. Scott in The New York Times: "Pure Hitchcockian panic. An arresting example of what a talented filmmaker can do with the sparest of means."
 Godfrey Cheshire in Variety: "An eerie, insinuating tale of urban dread and mental breakdown, [and] reps an impressively sophisticated solo directorial debut."
 Dennis Lim in the Village Voice: "With the director's impeccably chic expressionism and Henry Thomas's persuasive, dread-soaked performance, Fever sustains a convincingly spooky ambience throughout. Winter achieves a degree of technical polish rare among American independents."
 Phil Hall, Film Threat: "Mediocre thriller about a starving artist suspected of murder."

Awards
Official Selection, Cannes Film Festival, 1999.

External links

1999 films
British psychological thriller films
American psychological thriller films
1990s psychological thriller films
Films directed by Alex Winter
Films scored by Joe Delia
Films with screenplays by Alex Winter
1990s English-language films
1990s American films
1990s British films